Gareth Bennett may refer to:

 Gareth Bennett (priest) (1929–1987), British Anglican priest and academic
 Gareth Bennett (politician) (born 1968), Welsh politician

See also 
 Gary Bennett (disambiguation)